The Civic Offices is a municipal facility at Davitt's Quay in Dungarvan, County Waterford, Ireland.

History
Previously Waterford County Council had been based at Arus Brugha at Davitt's Quay. The county council moved to the new building, which cost €6 million to build, in April 1999. Some structural changes were carried out to the building following the merger of Waterford City Council and Waterford County Council to create Waterford City and County Council in 2014.

References

Buildings and structures in County Waterford
Dungarvan